The Eleanor Roosevelt Award for Human Rights was established in 1998 by the President of the United States Bill Clinton, honoring outstanding promoters of rights in the United States.

The award was first awarded on the 50th anniversary of the Universal Declaration of Human Rights, honoring Eleanor Roosevelt's role as the "driving force" in the development of the UN's Universal Declaration of Human Rights. The award was presented from 1998 to the end of the Clinton Administration in 2001.

In 2010, Secretary of State Hillary Rodham Clinton revived the Eleanor Roosevelt Award for Human Rights and presented the award on behalf of President Obama.

Recipients

References

Human rights awards
Awards established in 1998
Eleanor Roosevelt